During the 1977–78 English football season, Everton F.C. competed in the Football League First Division. They finished 3rd in the table with 55 points.

Final league table

Results

Football League First Division

FA Cup

League Cup

Squad

References

1977-78
Everton F.C. season